Niklaus Troxler (born May 1, 1947) is a Swiss graphic designer. He was the organizer of the Willisau Jazz Festival from 1975 to 2009.

Biography
Troxler studied graphic design at the Lucerne School of Art and Design. He worked as an art director in Paris in 1972 and subsequently founded his own design practice in Willisau, Switzerland. He started organizing jazz concerts in Willisau in 1966 and initiated the Willisau Jazz Festival in 1975. He organized this internationally renowned yearly Festival until 2009 before passing the baton over to his nephew, Arno Troxler.
Troxler's graphic works (particularly his concert posters and record cover designs) won him several relevant international awards: the Toulouse-Lautrec Medal in Gold (1987 and 1994), design awards in Lahti (1993), Helsinki (1997), Hong Kong (2000), Hangzhou (2003), Ningbo (2006), Taiwan (2005), and Colorado (2006). He won the Innerschweizer Kulturpreis (Cultural award of Central Switzerland) in 1982.
Troxler is a member of the Alliance Graphique Internationale. His posters are represented in the most renowned design collections worldwide, including the Museum of Modern Art in New York City, the Museum of Modern Art in Toyama, Hamburg's Museum for Art and Industry, the German Poster Museum in Essen, and the Stedelijk Museum in Amsterdam.

Troxler was professor for communication design at the State Academy for Art and Design in Stuttgart from 1998 to 2013.

Publications by Troxler
 Niklaus Troxler: "Jazz Blvd. – Niklaus Troxler Posters." Müller, Baden/Switzerland 1999, .
 Niklaus Troxler and Olivier Senn: "Willisau and All That Jazz." Till Schaap Edition, Berne 2013, .

Publications on Troxler
 Manfred Buholzer: "Jazz in Willisau – Wie Niklaus Troxler den Free Jazz nach Willisau brachte." Comenius Verlag, Lucerne 2004, .
 Jianping He (Ed.): "The Master of Design - Niklaus Troxler." Page One, Singapore 2006, .
 Roxane Jubert (Ed.): "Niklaus Troxler – Designer & Design." Pyramyd, Paris 2007, .
 Ginza Graphic Gallery (Ed.): "Niklaus Troxler." GGG Books, Tokyo 2007, .

Filmography
 Angelo A. Lüdin and Barbara Zürcher: "Niklaus Troxler - Jazz in Willisau - Ein Leben mit Jazz und Grafikdesign." (Documentary, point de vue, Basel 2011, 75 minutes).

References

External links
 Niklaus Troxler’s webpage
 The Willisau Jazz Archive
 Jazz Festival Willisau
 German Wikipedia article on Niklaus Troxler

Living people
1947 births
People from Willisau
Swiss graphic designers